Martakert (also) or Aghdara is a town de facto in the breakaway Republic of Artsakh as the administrative capital of its Martakert Province, de jure in the Tartar District of Azerbaijan, in the disputed region of Nagorno-Karabakh. The town has an ethnic Armenian-majority population, and also had an Armenian majority in 1989. The town underwent heavy destruction by Azerbaijani forces while under their control during the First Nagorno-Karabakh War.

Etymology 
Traditionally the name of the town is interpreted as consisting of the elements mard ("man, person," or in this context "brave") and kert ("built by"), supposedly referring to the inhabitants' reputation for bravery. Other explanations link the name with the word matuṛ ("chapel"). The Azerbaijani name for the settlement, Aghdara, translates to "white valley."

History 

The site of the settlement was historically a part of the Melikdom of Jraberd, one of the Melikdoms of Karabakh.

In 1918, a battle took place near the town between Ottoman and Armenian forces where the latter emerged victorious.

During the Soviet period, Martakert was the administrative centre of the Martakert District of the Nagorno-Karabakh Autonomous Oblast. It received the status of an urban-type settlement in 1960.

Historical heritage sites 
Historical heritage sites in and around the town include tombs from the 2nd–1st millennia BCE, the pre-Christian Krapasht Cemetery, the medieval village of Taza Khach, cemeteries from between the 17th and 19th centuries, St. John the Baptist Church built in 1883 (possibly originating from as early as the 13th century), and a bridge across the Kusapat River from the early 20th century.

Nagorno-Karabakh conflict

First Nagorno-Karabakh War 

During the First Nagorno-Karabakh War (1991–94), Martakert and the surrounding district saw heavy fighting, especially during the Azerbaijani Operation Goranboy and the Mardakert and Martuni Offensives in 1992. The town was captured by Azerbaijani forces on 4 July 1992, forcing Martakert's Armenian population to flee the town. Martakert was heavily damaged during the First Nagorno-Karabakh War and many of its buildings remain ruined and uninhabited. According to Thomas Goltz, who was in Martakert in September 1992, the town became a "a pile of rubble", noting "more intimate detritus of destroyed private lives: pots and pans, suitcases leaking sullied clothes, crushed baby strollers and even family portraits, still in shattered frames". HRW later noted that harsh actions taken by Karabakh Armenian forces during and after the offensive against Aghdam were seen as a revenge for the Azeri destruction of Martakert, in the context of  the tit-for-tat nature of the conflict. Martakert was recaptured by Armenian forces on 27 June 1993. The area around the town has been controlled by Artsakh since the end of the war. Some of Martakert's natives gradually returned over the years, but many remained in Armenia, Russia, and elsewhere.

Border clashes (1994–2020) 

The 2008 Mardakert clashes began on 4 March after the 2008 Armenian election protests. It involved the heaviest fighting between ethnic Armenian and Azerbaijani forces over the disputed region of Nagorno-Karabakh since the 1994 ceasefire after the First Nagorno-Karabakh War.

Armenian sources accused Azerbaijan of trying to take advantage of ongoing unrest in Armenia. Azerbaijani sources blamed Armenia, claiming that the Armenian government was trying to divert attention from internal tensions in Armenia.

In 2020, some clashes along the ceasefire lines took place near Martakert.

2020 Nagorno-Karabakh war 

During the 2020 Nagorno-Karabakh war, the town was bombed by Azerbaijani forces more than once, resulting in civilian deaths.

Geography 
The town is located on the right bank of the Tartar River, between two mountains.

Economy and culture 
The population mainly works in different state institutions as well as with agriculture. As of 2015, Martakert has a municipal building, a house of culture, two schools, two kindergartens, a youth centre, 88 commercial enterprises, two factories and a regional hospital. The enlarged municipal community of Martakert includes the villages of Haykajur, Jraberd, Maralyan Sarov, and Levonarkh.

Demographics

Notable people 
 

Vagharshak Grigoryan, Soviet medical doctor and professor

Gallery

Climate 
The climate in Martakert is classified as Humid subtropical climate (Cfa) by the Köppen climate classification.

Twin towns – sister cities 
  Vagarshapat, Armenia (since 2010).

Partnership agreement:
  Bourj Hammoud, Lebanon. In May 2018, representatives of the Artsakh city of Martakert and the Lebanese town of Bourj Hammoud signed a Memorandum of Cooperation. The memorandum states that aiming at the establishment of social, economic, tourism, and cultural relations between the two towns as well as realizing that cooperation between the towns can contribute to the strengthening of regional stability and peace.

References

External links 

 World Gazetteer: Azerbaijan  – World-Gazetteer.com
 
 

Azerbaijani administrative divisions of Artsakh
Cities and towns in the Republic of Artsakh
Populated places in Martakert Province
Cities and towns in Azerbaijan
Populated places in Tartar District